Mcleaniella is an extinct genus of sea snails, marine gastropod mollusks, in the family Liotiidae.

Species
Species within the genus Mcleaniella include:
 † Mcleaniella danae (d'Orbigny, 1850)

References

Liotiidae
Monotypic gastropod genera